Victor Vlad Cornea and Petr Nouza were the defending champions but chose to defend their title with different partners. Cornea partnered Sergio Martos Gornés but lost in the semifinals to Sander Arends and David Pel. Nouza partnered Vitaliy Sachko but lost in the first round to Cornea and Martos Gornés.

Arends and Pel won the title after defeating Patrik Niklas-Salminen and Bart Stevens 6–3, 7–6(7–3) in the final.

Seeds

Draw

References

External links
 Main draw

Oeiras Indoors II - Doubles